Echoes of the Tortured is the debut album by metal supergroup Sinsaenum. It was released on July 29, 2016.

Background
Guitarist Frédéric Leclercq, who composed all music on the album and co-wrote all lyrics, had some death metal demos but his commitments to DragonForce prevented them seeing the light of day. However, he eventually showed the demos to Loudblast frontman Stéphane Buriez who, along with ex-Slipknot and Murderdolls drummer Joey Jordison, founded the band. They recruited Sean Zatorsky of Dååth and Attila Csihar of Mayhem as dual lead vocalists and finally Heimoth of Seth on bass. They released their debut single and video for "Splendor and Agony" on July 12, 2016. They announced the release date as July 29, 2016, and released a two-song EP for streaming on June 6. Jordison described the music in an interview as "fucking powerful".

Track listing

Personnel
Sinsaenum
Sean Zatorsky – lead vocals
Attila Csihar – lead vocals
Frédéric Leclercq – guitars, bass, synthesizers
Stéphane Buriez – guitars
Heimoth – bass
Joey Jordison – drums

Additional personnel
Marcel Schirmer – vocals on "Army of Chaos"
Mirai Kawashima – vocals on "March" and "Army of Chaos"

Charts

References

2016 debut albums
Sinsaenum albums
Edel AG albums
Albums produced by Jens Bogren